Gleichen  is a hamlet in southeast Alberta, Canada within Wheatland County.

History 
It was named after Lord Edward Gleichen in 1884.   Gleichen was originally incorporated as a village on January 24, 1899 and then incorporated as a town on May 6, 1910.  After nearly 100 years as a municipality however, Gleichen dissolved to hamlet status under the jurisdiction of Wheatland County on March 31, 1998.

During the formation of the province, Gleichen was large enough to have its own seat in the Legislative Assembly of Alberta (see Gleichen provincial electoral district).  Its population peaked at 668 according to the Canada 1921 Census.

Due to its proximity to the railroad, Gleichen was readily accessible to farmers and ranchers living in the area. Its mostly wooden structures however posed an increased risk of widespread fires.  After the community burned a second time in 1912, many of its residents moved elsewhere, mostly to Calgary.

Climate 
Gleichen experiences a semi-arid climate (Köppen BSk). Winters are long, dry and cold, while summers are short and warm.

Demographics 

See also 
List of communities in Alberta
List of designated places in Alberta
List of former urban municipalities in Alberta
List of hamlets in Alberta

References

External links 
Hamlet of Gleichen

Hamlets in Alberta
Former towns in Alberta
Designated places in Alberta
Wheatland County, Alberta
Populated places disestablished in 1998